Scudéry is a surname. Notable people with the surname include:

Georges de Scudéry (1601–1667), French writer
Madeleine de Scudéry (1607–1701), French writer, sister of Georges